The Sad Horse is a 1959 American drama film directed by James B. Clark, written by Charles Hoffman and starring David Ladd, Chill Wills, Rex Reason, Patrice Wymore, Gregg Palmer and Eve Brent. One of API's first films, it was released in March 1959 by 20th Century Fox.

Plot

Polio-stricken 10-year-old boy Jackie Connors stays at his grandfather Captain Connors' horse farm while his father Bart goes away on a honeymoon with Sheila, his new wife. Jackie and his dog Hansel become acquainted with a woman named Leslie MacDonald and her thoroughbred North Wind, who hasn't seemed the same since the death of a dog that had been the horse's steady companion.

The unhappy Leslie is seeking a divorce from husband Bill and sees the child's Hansel as a replacement for the horse's dog. Jackie resists and she bribes Captain Connors with a $5,000 trust fund for the boy. Jackie and the dog head off to the hills, looking for a rumored buried treasure that could keep his grandfather from needing the woman's money. A mountain lion menaces the boy, who is saved in the nick of time.

Leslie and Bill reconcile. Bart returns and persuades Jackie that giving up the dog would be a grand gesture, and he agrees.

Cast 
David Ladd as Jackie Connors
Chill Wills as Capt Connors
Rex Reason as Bill MacDonald
Patrice Wymore as Leslie MacDonald
Gregg Palmer as Bart Connors
Eve Brent as Sheila
Leslie Bradley as Jonas
William Yip as Ben
Dave DePaul as Sam

Reception
The film was made by Robert L. Lippert, whose Regal outfits produced films for Fox for an average of $100,000. However, with competition from television, Lippert persuaded Fox to start financing as much as $300,000 per film, starting with The Sad Horse. He later claimed that the return on the film "was comparable to a $1 million picture."

References

External links 
 

1959 films
20th Century Fox films
CinemaScope films
American drama films
1959 drama films
Films about horses
Films directed by James B. Clark
Films scored by Paul Sawtell
1950s English-language films
1950s American films
English-language drama films